A Jamaâ  is a 2010 film directed by Daoud Aoulad-Syad. It was selected by African Film Festival of Cordoba - FCAT, San Sebastián International Film Festival and other international film festivals.

Plot 
To make Daoud Aoulad-Syad's previous film, En attendant Pasolini, sets were built on plots rented from those living in the village. A mosque was erected on the plot belonging to Moha, one of the neighbors. When they finished shooting, the film crew left the village. The neighbours demolished all of the sets, except for the mosque, which had become a real place of worship for those who live there. However, this is disastrous for Moha, who used to grow vegetables to feed his family on this land.

Prizes 
 Cinemed 2010
 San Sebastián 2010
 Tetuan 2011

References

External links

San Sebastián International Film Festival
Medfilm Festival 2011

2010 films
French comedy-drama films
Moroccan comedy-drama films
2010s French films